Here's Willy Moon is the only studio album by New Zealand singer, Willy Moon. The album was released in the United States through Interscope Records on 9 April 2013. The album fused various genres together, with elements of rock and roll, indie pop, noise pop and alternative dance. Here's Willy Moon garnered positive reviews from critics and spawned two singles: "Railroad Track" and "Yeah Yeah".

Singles 
The album's first single, "Railroad Track", was released on 20 August 2012. The album's second single, "Yeah Yeah", was released on 10 September 2012. The song samples Wu-Tang Clan's 1993 song "Wu-Tang Clan Ain't Nuthing ta Fuck Wit" from the rap group's debut album Enter the Wu-Tang (36 Chambers). It was featured in Apple's iPod commercial in late 2012 and peaked at number 26 in the UK charts and number 18 on the Billboard's Hot Rock Songs chart. Other singles did not chart, but have featured on TV commercials ('I Wanna Be Your Man', 'What I Want', and 'Working for the Company') and video game soundtracks ('Railroad Track').

Critical reception 

Here's Willy Moon received generally favourable reviews from most music critics. At Metacritic, which assigns a normalised rating out of 100 to reviews from mainstream critics, the album received an average score of 68, based on 12 reviews.

Hugo Montgomery of The Independent wrote about the album overall: "It's gimmicky, sure, but also pretty irresistible: his rasping vocals hit all the right louche notes, and the sub-three-minute tunes have a short, sharp impact that justifies the support he's received from Jack White." AllMusic's Stephen Thomas Erlewine called the album "all gaudy glitz, a cheerful pantomime for an audience that may not even exist, as it's hard to discern what generation would swoon for these swinging, corny retro novelties", but later wrote about its appeal by concluding that "this is music that is out there, it is not cooked up by consultants and marketers, it's a truly, genuinely strange attempt at something new -- it may miss its mark but that's why it's fascinating. Plus, it's got a good beat and you can dance to it." Michael Hann of The Guardian commented on the record being a time machine to the '80s with its "rockabilly/technology fusion": "Here's Willy Moon sounds far less like a fusion of Elvis and urban than it does Sigue Sigue Sputnik and Westworld, who had exactly the same idea nearly 30 years ago."

Commercial performance 
Here's Willy Moon has sold 5,000 copies in the United States as of March 2015.

Track listing

References 

2013 debut albums
Interscope Records albums
Island Records albums
Willy Moon albums